Ramazan Yerikuly Karimov (Ramazan Erıkūly Kärımov; born 5 July 1999) is a Kazakhstani footballer who plays as a forward for Maktaraal and the Kazakhstan national team.

Career
Karimov made his international debut for Kazakhstan on 28 March 2021 in a 2022 FIFA World Cup qualification match against France, which finished as a 0–2 home loss.

Career statistics

International

References

External links
 
 
 
 Ramazan Karimov at Vesti.kz

1999 births
Living people
Sportspeople from Astana
Kazakhstani footballers
Kazakhstan youth international footballers
Kazakhstan under-21 international footballers
Kazakhstan international footballers
Association football forwards
FC Astana players
FC Caspiy players
Kazakhstan Premier League players
Kazakhstan First Division players